The Delaware Public Service Commission is a public utilities commission, a quasi-judicial tribunal, which regulates investor-owned public utilities in the U.S. state of Delaware.  It regulates cable, electric, natural gas, wastewater, water and telecommunications services.

See also
Public Utilities Commission

External links
 Delaware Public Service Commission Website

Delaware
State agencies of Delaware